Laureano Ramírez Padilla (born December 24, 1965 in San Pedro de Macorís) is a retired Dominican boxer, who represented his native country at the 1984 Summer Olympics in Los Angeles in the Men's Flyweight division.

Ramírez  won the silver medal in the same weight category a year earlier at the 1983 Pan American Games. In the final he was defeated by Cuba's Pedro Orlando Reyes.

1984 Olympic results
Below are the results of Laureano Ramirez, a flyweight boxer from the Dominican Republic, who competed at the 1984 Los Angeles Olympics:

 Round of 32: defeated Oscar Carballo (Argentina) referee stopped contest in second round
 Round of 16: defeated Jose Rodriguez (Puerto Rico) by decision, 5-0
 Quarterfinal: lost to Ibrahim Bilali (Kenya) by decision, 0-5

References
 sports-reference

1965 births
Living people
Flyweight boxers
Olympic boxers of the Dominican Republic
Boxers at the 1983 Pan American Games
Boxers at the 1984 Summer Olympics
Dominican Republic male boxers
Pan American Games silver medalists for the Dominican Republic
Pan American Games medalists in boxing
Central American and Caribbean Games silver medalists for the Dominican Republic
Competitors at the 1986 Central American and Caribbean Games
Central American and Caribbean Games medalists in boxing
Medalists at the 1983 Pan American Games